The Đa Nhim Hydroelectric Power Station is a power station on the Đa Nhim River in Vietnam. Phase 1 construction started in April 1961 and was finished in January 1964. It has installed capacity of 160 MW.  Đa Nhim Lake is at an altitude .

It was the first hydroelectric power station in South Vietnam. Electricity produced here supplied the central region of Vietnam but was unable to reach the large industrial centres in Saigon and Bien Hoa, which had to rely on oil for electricity generation. Two large pipes, crossing the road, carrying water from a height of 1,000 metres to Đa Nhim lake to drive the turbines of the Hydropower Plant.

References

Dams in Vietnam
Hydroelectric power stations in Vietnam
Energy infrastructure completed in 1964
Japan International Cooperation Agency